Marie-Madeleine Frémy (died 1788) was a French painter.

Daughter of François-Nicolas Frémy, seigneur de La Marque, and Madeleine Charlot, Frémy was a cousin of Adélaïde Labille-Guiard, with whom she studied. Her parents were married in Troyes in 1758; her date of birth is unknown, but it is presumed that as second daughter she was likely born in Aube in the early 1760s. In 1783 she exhibited a pastel and a number of portrait miniatures in Paris, among which was a portrait of her fellow pupil Marie-Victoire Davril.

References

Year of birth unknown
1788 deaths
French women painters
French portrait painters
18th-century French painters
18th-century French women artists
Portrait miniaturists
Pupils of Adélaïde Labille-Guiard